Wheels Magazine is a Swedish automobile magazine published in Stockholm, Sweden.

History and profile
Wheels Magazine was founded in 1977. The magazine is published by Egmont Tidskrifter AB in Stockholm. It mostly deals with hot rods and custom cars.

In 2014 the circulation of Wheels Magazine was 15,400 copies.

References

External links
 Wheels Magazine

1977 establishments in Sweden
Automobile magazines
Magazines established in 1977
Magazines published in Stockholm
Swedish-language magazines